Mystica may refer to:

Mystica (Axel Rudi Pell album), 2006
Mystica (The Blood Divine album), 1997
Mystica (band), a Goa trance project from Israel